Robert Brydon Jones  (born 3 May 1965) is a Welsh actor, comedian, impressionist, presenter, singer and writer. He played Dr Paul Hamilton in the Australian/British comedy series Supernova, Bryn West in the BBC sitcom Gavin & Stacey and Keith Barret in the BBC comedy series Marion and Geoff and its spin-off The Keith Barret Show.

He has appeared in a number of shows for the BBC with Steve Coogan, including The Trip series in 2010, released as a feature film later that year; and The Trip to Italy in 2014 and The Trip to Spain in 2017 and The Trip to Greece in 2020, also edited and released as feature films.

Since 2009, Brydon has presented the BBC One comedy panel show Would I Lie to You? after previously playing himself as host of a fictional panel show in Rob Brydon's Annually Retentive, which ran on BBC Three from 2006 until 2007. In addition to presenting his own late-night chat show, The Rob Brydon Show, for two years and hosting the 2014 Saturday-night game show The Guess List for BBC One, Brydon has also appeared in notable films including Cruise of the Gods, The Gruffalo, 24 Hour Party People, The Huntsman: Winter's War and Holmes & Watson.

Early life
Brydon was born on 3 May 1965 in Baglan, Glamorgan. His mother, Joy Jones (née Brydon), was a school teacher, and his father, Howard Jones, was a car dealer. He grew up in Baglan, with his younger brother Peter (born 1973).

Brydon was educated at two private schools: St. John's School in Porthcawl, which Eddie Izzard also attended, and Dumbarton House School in Swansea until the age of 14. This was followed by Porthcawl Comprehensive School, where he met Ruth Jones (with whom he later worked in Gavin & Stacey) and became a member of the school's youth theatre group. While at Dumbarton, he once stole the lunch money of fellow pupil Catherine Zeta-Jones (which he admitted while participating in a series 4 episode of Would I Lie To You?).

Brydon has said that his primary childhood influences in comedy were Barry Humphries, Frankie Howerd and Woody Allen. He has also said that he used to memorise entire sketches by Peter Cook, Dudley Moore and Peter Sellers.

Career
Brydon attended the Royal Welsh College of Music & Drama, Cardiff. He left after a year, to join Radio Wales at the age of 20. His early broadcasts included work as a disc jockey on BBC Radio Wales, when his Saturday morning shows included contributions from stand-up comedian Pete Park-Walker. Between 1992 and 1994, on Radio Wales (where he stayed for six years) he was the main presenter of Rave, one of BBC Radio 5's youth magazine and music programmes, with Alan Thompson. He developed his Marion and Geoff story from this.

In 1994 and 1995 Brydon appeared in numerous episodes of the original Radio Wales version of the cult comedy Satellite City with Boyd Clack. Although he has stayed with radio as a comedy performer on BBC Radio Five Live's The Treatment, Brydon also does occasional stints as a stand-in presenter on BBC Radio 2. He has stood in for Ken Bruce, one of the people whom he impersonates. On 1 April 2011 he appeared in Bruce's place on his show as an April Fools' Day joke.

Between September and October 2011, Brydon starred alongside Kenneth Branagh in Francis Veber's play The Painkiller at the Lyric Theatre in Belfast. He reprised his role with Branagh, in March and April 2016, at the Garrick Theatre in London's West End. Whilst not calling himself an impressionist Brydon says he "started out as an impressionist" but will "bristle" when described as such. His impressions include Alec Guinness, James Dean, Michael J. Fox, Richard Burton, Tom Jones, Michael Caine, Mick Jagger and Ronnie Corbett. He is also noted for his "Small Man in A Box" impression.

In an episode of Would I Lie To You?, Rob admitted that he pretended to be his own agent during the early part of his career in order to get more money.

In 2021 he appeared in the first episode of the second series of the show McDonald & Dodds.

Voice-over artist
Brydon was first known nationally as a voice artist. He provided several voices for the Discworld computer games, radio & television programmes like Eurotrash and continuity announcements for BBC 1. He is also known for voice-over work in television advertising, including for Renault, Tango, The Times, Tesco, Abbey National, Sainsbury's, McDonald's, Pot Noodle, Domino's Pizza, Crunchy Nut Cornflakes, The Observer and Fairy Liquid. He voiced the main character, Lewton, in the Discworld computer game Discworld Noir, and provided voices in animated films such as The Gruffalo, The Gruffalo's Child and Room on the Broom.

Writing breakthrough
For a brief period in the early 1990s Brydon was a presenter for the Home Shopping Network. He began to find small roles in several successful films and television series. In 2000 he made his mark in television comedy, with two series which he co-wrote and performed for the BBC: Human Remains, co-written by Julia Davis; and the commercially successful Marion and Geoff.

Since these series Brydon has developed a career path as a character actor, in both comedic and serious roles. He portrayed controversial theatre critic Kenneth Tynan in the BBC Four film Kenneth Tynan: In Praise of Hardcore (2005), opposite Julian Sands as Laurence Olivier.

His character Bryn West in Gavin & Stacey, written by Ruth Jones and James Corden, allowed him to return to his South Wales roots. In this role Brydon performed the 2009 Comic Relief charity single, "(Barry) Islands in the Stream", with Ruth Jones (both actors appearing as their characters from Gavin & Stacey) and singer Tom Jones. It reached No.1 in the UK Singles Chart on 15 March 2009.

In 2010 Brydon starred alongside Steve Coogan in Michael Winterbottom's partially improvised BBC Two sitcom series The Trip, in which both actors played fictionalised versions of their public personas (Brydon, optimistic and always eager to do an impression; and Coogan, misanthropic and bitter that he's not the major international star he believes he should be).

Brydon's book Small Man in a Book (the title a play on his "small-man-in-a-box" impression) was published in November 2011.

Panellist/chairman
In 2006, Brydon first appeared on the BBC Radio 4 comedy panel game I'm Sorry I Haven't a Clue. His singing voice earned the unprecedented accolade from the former host, Humphrey Lyttelton, of being "not bad". When the team went on a tour of non-broadcast stage shows, Brydon filled in as chairman when Lyttelton was in hospital to repair an aortic aneurysm. Lyttelton died in hospital after surgery.

In February 2009, it was announced that Brydon would be one of three people to replace Lyttelton as chairman of the 51st series of I'm Sorry I Haven't a Clue (the others being Stephen Fry and Jack Dee). Brydon also appeared as guest panellist in the first two episodes of series 52, chaired by Jack Dee. He returned as a guest panellist in the last two episodes of series 54 in January 2011.

Additionally, in 2009 he took over as host of Would I Lie To You?, replacing Angus Deayton. Brydon had also appeared as a guest panellist on the show during the previous season. Brydon has presented an episode of Have I Got News for You and has appeared on BBC Radio 4's panel game Just a Minute.

Brydon narrated a two-part programme on BBC Radio 4, The Pain of Laughter: The Last Days of Kenneth Williams. It explored the latter part of Williams's life, featuring many of the performer's friends and contemporaries. In other radio work Brydon sat in for Ken Bruce on BBC Radio 2 for one day only on 25 August 2008. In addition to this, on 1 April 2011, Brydon impersonated Bruce for the entire two-hour and thirty minutes show. Bruce came on the air at the end of the show to reveal the prank.

Brydon has appeared on the TV comedy quiz QI. In his first appearance (Series A, episode 5), his talent for mimicry was displayed with impressions of Alec Guinness, James Dean, and Michael J. Fox. In the 2008 Christmas special, he provided impressions of Richard Burton and Tom Jones.

Stand-up
In 2009/10 Brydon had his first stand-up tour in the UK as Rob Brydon (rather than as a differently named character). The resulting DVD of the 2009/10 show, Rob Brydon: Live, was released on 23 November 2009. Brydon appeared as a host on episode two of series five of the BBC series of Live at the Apollo.

In 2010 Brydon took part in Channel 4's Comedy Gala, a benefit show in aid of Great Ormond Street Children's Hospital, filmed live at the O2 Arena in London on 30 March. He was one of six compères for the Queen's Diamond Jubilee Concert held outside Buckingham Palace on 4 June 2012.

Personal life
Brydon was married to Martina Fitchie from 1992 to 2000. They had two daughters and a son.

On 6 October 2006, Brydon married Clare Holland, a former producer on The South Bank Show, at Windsor church. They live in Strawberry Hill in the London Borough of Richmond upon Thames. They have two sons. A keen golfer, Brydon is also a Swansea City fan and is an ambassador to their 1912 foundation.

In August 2014, Brydon was one of 200 public figures who were signatories to a letter to The Guardian opposing Scottish independence in the run-up to the 2014 Scottish independence referendum.

Honours and awards
Brydon was made an honorary fellow of the Royal Welsh College of Music and Drama where he previously studied. Brydon was appointed Member of the Order of the British Empire (MBE) in the 2013 Birthday Honours for services to comedy and broadcasting, and for charitable services.

Filmography

Film

Television

Radio appearances

Other appearances
 Rob Brydon's Identity Crisis (March 2008)
 The One Show (December 2009)
 Desert Island Discs (May 2010), his favourite track was "Born to Run" by Bruce Springsteen
 TV advertising campaign for P&O Cruises (2014–)
 Script editor for a season 2 of Little Britain

Discography

Singles

References

External links
 Official Rob Brydon site 
 
 BAFTA Interview with Rob Brydon – April 2010

News items
Scotsman October 2011 article
 Times February 2008 article
 Independent January 2006 article
 Telegraph June 2004 article 
 Observer December 2002 article

1965 births
Living people
20th-century Welsh comedians
20th-century Welsh male actors
20th-century Welsh writers
21st-century Welsh comedians
21st-century Welsh male actors
21st-century Welsh writers
Alumni of the Royal Welsh College of Music & Drama
Audiobook narrators
British male television writers
British television talk show hosts
Male actors from Swansea
Members of the Order of the British Empire
People educated at Dumbarton House School
People educated at Porthcawl Comprehensive School
Welsh autobiographers
Welsh male comedians
Welsh male film actors
Welsh male television actors
Welsh male video game actors
Welsh male voice actors
Welsh television personalities
Welsh television presenters
Welsh television producers
Welsh television writers